Star Shoot (1898 – November 19, 1919) was a Thoroughbred racehorse that was bred in Ireland, raced in the United Kingdom and was eventually imported to the United States to become a five-time leading sire in the early 1900s. He was a white stockinged, chestnut colt sired by the great British 1893 Triple Crown winner, Isinglass, out of the Hermit bred mare Astrology. He is best remembered for siring the American Classic winning sons Sir Barton and Grey Lag and the 1917 American Oaks winning filly Wistful I.

Early years and racing
Star Shoot was bred and foaled in 1898 at Eyrefield Lodge Stud in Caragh, which was owned by Major Eustace Loder. He was a sickly foal but did recover to be a major two-year-old contender in the British racing circuit, finishing second at his debut at the Summer Breeders' Foal Plate in June 1900. Star Shoot won the Hurst Park Foal Plate, British Dominion Two-Year-Old Plate and won the National Breeders' Produce Stakes in a dead heat. However, he soon developed respiratory problems that negatively impacted his racing performance thereafter and consequently he was not entered in any British Classic races.

Years at stud
Due to his respiratory issues and having developed soft feet, Star Shoot was not seen as a good breeding prospect in Britain and was sold in 1901 to an American Thoroughbred importer named John Hanning for a fraction of what other horses of his breeding fetched. He was bought by Runnymede Farm in Paris, Kentucky and stood at stud there until 1912 when he was purchased by John E. Madden. Star Shoot was moved to Hamburg Place Stud, Madden's farm near Lexington, Kentucky. Star Shoot died of pneumonia on November 19, 1919 and was buried in the equine cemetery at Hamburg Place Farm.

Progeny
Star Shoot notably sired Sir Barton, the first winner of the Triple Crown and Grey Lag, winner of the 1921 Belmont Stakes. He also sired the broodmares Christmas Star (dam of Mars), Livonia (dam of The Finn) and Daylight Saving. He was determined to be the leading sire in North America five times (in 1911, 1912, 1916, 1917 and 1919) and was top broodmare sire from 1924-1929.

Pedigree

References

1898 racehorse births
1919 racehorse deaths
Racehorses bred in Ireland
Racehorses trained in the United Kingdom
United States Champion Thoroughbred Sires
American Champion Thoroughbred broodmare sires
Thoroughbred family 9-f
Chefs-de-Race